This is a list of the principal leaders of the Crusades, classified by Crusade.

First Crusade (1096–1099)

Peasants' Crusade
Emicho, leader of the German Crusade
Walter the Penniless

Princes' Crusade
Bohemond, Prince of Taranto and founder of the Principality of Antioch
Tancred, his nephew, founder of the Principality of Galilee

Godfrey of Bouillon, Duke of Lower Lorraine and first Defender of the Holy Sepulchre
Eustace III of Boulogne, his brother and Count of Boulogne
Baldwin, his brother, founder of the County of Edessa and first King of Jerusalem
Hugh of Fauquembergues, later Prince of Galilee
Gervaise of Bazoches, later Prince of Galilee
Fulcher of Chartres
Baldwin de le Bourg, his cousin and second King of Jerusalem
Hugh II, Count of Saint-Pol
Eustace Grenier
Baldwin II, Count of Hainaut
Warner of Grez
Raymond de Saint-Gilles, Count of Toulouse and founder of the County of Tripoli
Adhemar de Monteil, Bishop of Le Puy and papal legate
William-Jordan, Count of Cerdagne and Berga
Gaston IV of Béarn
Centule II of Bigorre
Girard Guinard, Count of Roussillon
Aicard, Archbishop of Arles
Hugh VI of Lusignan
Berenguer Ramon II, Count of Barcelona
Peter Bartholomew
Raymond of Aguilers
Raimbaut, count of Orange
Roman of Le Puy
William V of Montpellier
William, Bishop of Orange
Robert Curthose, Duke of Normandy
Odo of Bayeux
Arnulf of Chocques, chaplain and later Patriarch of Jerusalem
Ralph de Guader
Rotrou III, Count of Perche
Robert II, Count of Flanders
Geoffrey II Jordan, Count of Vendôme
Héribrand II of Hierges
Stephen II, Count of Blois
Hugh of Vermandois
Enguerrand I, Lord of Coucy
Thomas, Lord of Coucy
Guglielmo Embriaco
Guy II of Montlhéry
Alan IV, Duke of Brittany
William the Carpenter
Gouffier of Lastours

Crusade of 1101
Raymond of St. Gilles
Stephen II, Count of Blois
Stephen I, Count of Burgundy
Eudes I, Duke of Burgundy
Hugh VI of Lusignan
Anselm IV, Archbishop of Milan
William II of Nevers
William IX of Aquitaine
Hugh of Vermandois
Welf I, Duke of Bavaria
Ekkehard of Aura
Joscelin of Courtenay
Dagobert of Pisa
Odo Arpin of Bourges

Post-Crusade of 1101
Baldwin of Hestrut
Ghibbelin of Arles
Hugh II of Le Puiset
Hugh II of Jaffa
Sigurd I of Norway
Hugh I of Champagne
Hugues de Payens
Humphrey I of Toron
Bertrand of Toulouse
William Bures
Fulk V of Anjou
Barisan of Ibelin
Pagan the Butler

Second Crusade (1145–1149)

From Europe
Louis VII of France
Robert I of Dreux
Peter I of Courtenay
Raoul I of Vermandois
Thierry of Alsace
Alphonse I of Toulouse
Roger I Trencavel
Raymond I Trencavel
Raynald of Châtillon
Enguerrand II, Lord of Coucy
Eleanor of Aquitaine
Henry I of Champagne
William de Warenne
Hugh VII of Lusignan
Renaut I of Bar
Amadeus III of Savoy
William V of Montferrat
William VII of Auvergne
Odo of Deuil
Conrad III of Germany
Frederick II, Duke of Swabia
Otto of Freising
Ottokar III of Styria
Henry II of Austria
Herman III, Margrave of Baden
Roger de Beaumont, 2nd Earl of Warwick

From the Crusader states
Baldwin III of Jerusalem
Amalric, Count of Jaffa
Melisende of Jerusalem
Philip of Milly
Manasses of Hierges
Robert of Craon
Raymond du Puy de Provence
Humphrey II of Toron
Walter Grenier
Barisan of Ibelin

Post-Second Crusade
Philip, Count of Flanders
Stephen I of Sancerre
William of Montferrat
Hugh VIII of Lusignan
Guy of Lusignan
Amalric of Lusignan
Baldwin of Ibelin
Balian of Ibelin
Hugh of Ibelin
William II of Bures
Gerard Grenier
Miles of Plancy

Crusader invasions of Egypt (1163–1169)
Amalric I of Jerusalem
Philip of Milly
Hugh of Ibelin
Miles of Plancy
Frederick de la Roche
Bertrand de Blanchefort
Gilbert of Assailly
Andronikos Kontostephanos

Third Crusade (1189–1192)

From Europe
Conrad of Montferrat
Richard I, King of England
André de Chauvigny
Baldwin of Exeter
Joseph of Exeter
William de Ferrers
Walchelin de Ferriers
Hugh III, Duke of Burgundy
Galeran V of Beaumont
Henry II, Count of Champagne
Guy of Bazoches
Peter de Preaux
Phillipe de Plessis
Robert de Beaumont
Roger of Hoveden
Alan fitz Walter, 2nd High Steward of Scotland
Ambroise
Hubert Walter
William des Roches
Ranulf de Glanvill
Eustace de Vesci
Philip II of France
Theobald V, Count of Blois
Alberic Clement
Conon de Béthune
Robert II of Dreux
Philip of Dreux, son of Robert I of Dreux and a bishop of Beauvais
Philip of Alsace
 Roger de Wavrin, bishop of Cambrai
Henry I of Bar
Stephen I of Sancerre
Peter II of Courtenay
Raoul I, Lord of Coucy
William II, Lord of Béthune
Frederick I, Holy Roman Emperor
Frederick VI, Duke of Swabia
Floris III, Count of Holland
Henry of Kalden
Herman IV, Margrave of Baden
Leopold V, Duke of Austria
Rudolf of Zähringen
Otto I of Guelders
Děpolt II of Bohemia
William II of Sicily

From the Crusader states
Guy of Lusignan
Sibylla of Jerusalem
Eraclius of Jerusalem
Balian of Ibelin
Hugh of Ibelin
Reginald of Sidon
Raynald of Châtillon
Gerard de Ridefort
Robert IV de Sablé
Baldwin IV of Jerusalem
Humphrey IV of Toron

Crusade of 1197
Henry VI, Holy Roman Emperor
Conrad II, Margrave of Lusatia
Henry I, Duke of Brabant
Conrad of Wittelsbach
Wolfger von Erla

Fourth Crusade (1202–1204)
Boniface of Montferrat
Louis I, Count of Blois
Enrico Dandolo
Baldwin I of Constantinople
Henry of Flanders

Fifth Crusade (1217–1221)
John of Brienne
Bohemond IV of Antioch
Hugh I of Cyprus
Leopold VI, Duke of Austria
Pelagio Galvani
Pedro de Montaigu
Hermann von Salza
Guérin de Montaigu
Andrew II of Hungary
William I, Count of Holland
Henry I of Rodez
Alamanno da Costa

Sixth Crusade (1228–1229)
Frederick II, Holy Roman Emperor
Hermann von Salza

William Briwere
Peter des Roches

Barons' Crusade
Theobald I, King of Navarre 
Hugh IV, Duke of Burgundy
Amaury de Montfort
Peter I, Duke of Brittany
Ralph of Soissons
Guigues IV of Forez
Henry II, Count of Bar
John of Mâcon
Richard, 1st Earl of Cornwall
Simon de Montfort, 6th Earl of Leicester
William II Longespée
Walter IV, Count of Brienne, Lord of Jaffa
Odo of Montbéliard
Balian of Beirut
John of Arsuf
Balian of Sidon

Seventh Crusade (1248–1254)
Louis IX of France
Theobald I of Navarre
Alfonso, Count of Poitou 
Charles of Anjou
Robert I of Artois
Guillaume de Sonnac  
Renaud de Vichiers

Eighth Crusade (1270)
Louis IX of France
Theobald II of Navarre
Alfonso, Count of Poitou
Charles of Anjou

Ninth Crusade (1271)
Edward I of England
Charles of Anjou
Leo II, King of Armenia
Hugh III of Cyprus
Bohemond VI of Antioch

11th-century military personnel
12th-century military personnel
13th-century military personnel
Crusaders 
Crusaders